This is a list of life peerages created prior to the Appellate Jurisdiction Act 1876 and the Life Peerages Act 1958.

Richard II (1377–1399)
1377 – Guichard d'Angle, Earl of Huntingdon
1385 – Robert de Vere, Marquess of Dublin
1386 – Robert de Vere, Duke of Ireland
1397 – Margaret, Duchess of Norfolk

Henry V (1413–1422)
1414 – John of Lancaster, Duke of Bedford
1414 – Humphrey of Lancaster, Duke of Gloucester
1416 – Thomas Beaufort, Duke of Exeter

Henry VIII (1509–1547)
1514: Thomas Howard, Earl of Surrey

James I (1603–1625)
1618 – Mary Villiers, Countess of Buckingham

Charles I (1625–1649)
1640 – Mary Howard, Baroness Stafford
1688 – Mary Howard, Countess of Stafford
1641 – Elizabeth Savage, Countess Rivers
1644 – Alice Dudley, Duchess of Dudley

The Protectorate
1658–1659 – Cromwell's Other House – The life members of the Other House were addressed as "Lord". About forty men took up their seats in the Other House. However, after the restoration of the monarchy in 1660, neither the chamber or the titles of men who sat in it were recognised by the restored regime.

Charles II (1660–1685)
1660 – Katherine Stanhope, Countess of Chesterfield
1660 – Elizabeth Boyle, Countess of Guilford
1660 – William Douglas, Duke of Hamilton (Peerage of Scotland; husband of Anne Hamilton, 3rd Duchess of Hamilton)
1660 – Walter Scott, Earl of Tarras (Peerage of Scotland; husband of Mary Scott, 3rd Countess of Buccleuch)
1672 – James Wemyss, Lord Burntisland (Peerage of Scotland; husband of Margaret Wemyss, 3rd Countess of Wemyss)
1673 – Louise de Kérouaille, Duchess of Portsmouth
1674 – Anne Murray, Viscountess Bayning
1674 – Susan Belasyse, Baroness Belasyse
1679 – Sarah Corbet, Viscountess Corbet
1680 – Elizabeth Walter, Countess of Sheppey
1685 – Francis Abercromby, Lord Glasford (Peerage of Scotland; husband of Anne Sempill, 9th Lady Sempill)

James II (1685–1689)
1686 – Catherine Sedley, Countess of Dorchester
1688 – Elizabeth Petty, Baroness Shelburne (Peerage of Ireland)

George I (1714–1727)
1716 – Ehrengard Melusine von der Schulenburg, Duchess of Munster (Peerage of Ireland)
1719 – Ehrengard Melusine von der Schulenburg, Duchess of Kendal
1721 – Sophia Charlotte von Kielmansegg, Countess of Leinster (Peerage of Ireland)
1722 – Sophia Charlotte von Kielmansegg, Countess of Darlington
1722 – Melusina von der Schulenburg, Countess of Walsingham

George II (1727–1760)
1740 – Amalie Sophie Marianne von Wallmoden, Countess of Yarmouth
1758 – Ellis Bermingham, Countess of Brandon

Victoria (1837–1901)
1856 – James Parke, Baron Wensleydale

See also
List of life peerages after 1958
List of law life peerages
List of peerages created for women

 
Life peers before 1876